Man from Reno is a 2014 neo-noir crime, drama film starring Ayako Fujitani, Pepe Serna, Kazuki Kitamura and directed by Dave Boyle.

Plot
A small-town sheriff, Paul Del Moral accidentally runs into and knocks down a man late at night on an isolated road. A best-selling Japanese crime novelist, Aki Akahori, has a one-night stand with a mysterious man who suddenly disappears. The two stories eventually dovetail. Furthermore, endangered turtles, cold blooded murders, a night of heated passion, deceit, paparazzi, secrets, a professional impostor, and a rich Brit and his burly henchmen are involved in this baffling mystery plot.

Cast
Ayako Fujitani as Aki 
Pepe Serna as Paul Del Moral 
Kazuki Kitamura as Akira 
Yasuyo Shiba as Junko 
Hiroshi Watanabe as Hitoshi 
Tetsuo Kuramochi as Shinsuke 
Yuki Matsuzaki as Tsubasa 
Shiori Ideta as Chika 
Elisha Skorman as Teresa Del Moral 
Masami Kosaka as Tatsuji 
Rome Kanda as Kageyama 
Ross Turner as Doctor 
Thomas Cokenias as Bald Man 
Geo Epsilanty as Porter 
Ron Eliot as Desk clerk

References

External links
Man from Reno at IMDB
Film's official website
Andrew Barker, Variety (June 18, 2014)
Mark Olson, Los Angeles Times (June 18, 2014)

2014 films
American mystery films
Films about writers
Films set in San Francisco
2010s Japanese-language films
American neo-noir films
2010s American films